Gutya may refer to:
Gutya, a diminutive of the Russian male first name Avgust
Gutya, a diminutive of the Russian female first name Avgusta
Gutya, a diminutive of the Russian female first name Avgustina